Charles Marshall Thomson (25 October 1905 – 1965) was a Scottish professional footballer who played as a goalkeeper for Scottish League clubs Raith Rovers, Alloa Athletic and Falkirk and made 169 Football League appearances for Brighton & Hove Albion.

Life and career
Thomson was born in Perth. He played for St Johnstone YMCA and for Scottish League clubs Alloa Athletic and Falkirk, where he spent four seasons, before moving to England to sign for Third Division South club Brighton & Hove Albion in 1934. He was a first-team regular for five years.

Thomson joined Exeter City in 1939, and played in the first three matches of the 1939–40 Football League before competitive football was abandoned for the duration of the Second World War. He then returned to Scotland where he played for Dundee United in the Eastern Regional League and was on the losing side in the Scottish War Emergency Cup, won by Rangers. After the war, he rejoined Exeter City to play in the 1945–46 FA Cup before going back to Scotland.

Thomson's son, Chic Thomson, kept goal for Chelsea during their 1954–55 Football League-winning campaign and won the 1959 FA Cup Final with Nottingham Forest.

References

1905 births
1965 deaths
Footballers from Perth, Scotland
Scottish footballers
Association football goalkeepers
Raith Rovers F.C. players
Alloa Athletic F.C. players
Falkirk F.C. players
Brighton & Hove Albion F.C. players
Exeter City F.C. players
Dundee United F.C. wartime guest players
Scottish Football League players
English Football League players